The Ecuador women's national football team has represented Ecuador at the FIFA Women's World Cup on one occasion, in 2015.

FIFA Women's World Cup record

Record by opponent

2015 FIFA Women's World Cup

Group E

Goalscorers

References

 
Countries at the FIFA Women's World Cup